The 1993 New York Yankees season was the 91st season for the Yankees. The team finished with a record of 88-74 finishing 7 games behind the Toronto Blue Jays for their first winning season since 1988. New York was managed by Buck Showalter. The Yankees played at Yankee Stadium. This would be the last time the Yankees would miss the playoffs until 2008.

Offseason
November 3, 1992: Roberto Kelly was traded by the Yankees to the Cincinnati Reds for Paul O'Neill and Joe DeBerry (minors).
November 6, 1992: Greg Cadaret was purchased from the Yankees by the Cincinnati Reds.
November 17, 1992: Charlie Hayes was drafted from the Yankees by the Colorado Rockies with the 3rd pick in the 1992 MLB Expansion Draft.
December 4, 1992: Spike Owen was signed as a free agent by the Yankees.
December 6, 1992: J. T. Snow, Jerry Nielsen, and Russ Springer were traded by the Yankees to the California Angels for Jim Abbott.
December 7, 1992: Sherman Obando was drafted from the Yankees by the Baltimore Orioles rule 5 draft.
December 10, 1992: Jimmy Key was signed as a free agent by the Yankees.
December 15, 1992: Wade Boggs was signed as a free agent by the Yankees.

Regular season

Season standings

Record vs. opponents

Notable Transactions
July 30, 1993: John Habyan was traded by the Yankees to the Kansas City Royals as part of a 3-team trade. The Chicago Cubs sent Paul Assenmacher to the Yankees. The Royals sent Tuffy Rhodes to the Cubs.
August 31, 1993: Rich Batchelor was traded by the Yankees to the St. Louis Cardinals for Lee Smith.

Roster

Game log

Regular season

|- style="background:#cfc;"
| 1 || April 5 || @ Indians || 9–1 || || || – || Cleveland Stadium || 1–0
|- style="background:#fbb;"
| 2 || April 7 || @ Indians || 2–4 || || || || Cleveland Stadium || 1–1
|- style="background:#fbb;"
| 3 || April 8 || @ Indians || 5–15 || || || – || Cleveland Stadium || 1–2
|- style="background:#cfc;"
| 4 || April 9 || @ White Sox || 11–6 || || || – || Comiskey Park (II) || 2–2
|- style="background:#cfc;"
| 5 || April 10 || @ White Sox || 12–0 || || || – || Comiskey Park (II) || 3–2
|- style="background:#fbb;"
| 6 || April 11 || @ White Sox || 4–6 || || || || Comiskey Park (II) || 3–3
|- style="background:#cfc;"
| 7 || April 12 || Royals || 4–1 || || || – || Yankee Stadium || 4–3
|- style="background:#cfc;"
| 8 || April 14 || Royals || 6–5 || || || || Yankee Stadium || 5–3
|- style="background:#fbb;"
| 9 || April 15 || Royals || 4–5 || || || || Yankee Stadium || 5–4
|-

|- style="background:#cfc;"
| 48 || May 28 || White Sox || 4–0 || || || – || Yankee Stadium || 26–22
|- style="background:#cfc;"
| 49 || May 29 || White Sox || 8–2 || || || – || Yankee Stadium || 27–22
|- style="background:#cfc;"
| 50 || May 30 || White Sox || 6–3 || || || || Yankee Stadium || 28–22
|- style="background:#cfc;"
| 51 || May 31 || Indians || 8–2 || || || – || Yankee Stadium || 29–22
|-

|- style="background:#fbb;"
| 52 || June 1 || Indians || 6–15 || || || – || Yankee Stadium || 29–23
|- style="background:#cfc;"
| 53 || June 2 || Indians || 8–5 || || || || Yankee Stadium || 30–23
|- style="background:#fbb;"
| 57 || June 7 || @ Royals || 3–8 || || || – || Royals Stadium || 31–26
|- style="background:#cfc;"
| 58 || June 8 || @ Royals || 9–4 || || || – || Royals Stadium || 32–26
|- style="background:#fbb;"
| 59 || June 9 || @ Royals || 3–10 || || || – || Royals Stadium || 32–27
|-

|-

|- style="background:#cfc;"
| 123 || August 20 || Royals || 7–2 || || || – || Yankee Stadium || 70–53
|- style="background:#cfc;"
| 124 || August 21 || Royals || 3–2 || || || || Yankee Stadium || 71–53
|- style="background:#fbb;"
| 125 || August 22 || Royals || 0–7 || || || – || Yankee Stadium || 71–54
|- style="background:#cfc;"
| 126 || August 23 || @ White Sox || 6–5  || || || || Comiskey Park (II) || 72–54
|- style="background:#fbb;"
| 127 || August 24 || @ White Sox || 2–4 || || || || Comiskey Park (II) || 72–55
|- style="background:#cfc;"
| 128 || August 25 || @ White Sox || 7–5 || || || || Comiskey Park (II) || 73–55
|- style="background:#cfc;"
| 129 || August 26 || @ Indians || 4–0 || || || || Cleveland Stadium || 74–55
|- style="background:#fbb;"
| 130 || August 27 || @ Indians || 2–9 || || || – || Cleveland Stadium || 74–56
|- style="background:#fbb;"
| 131 || August 28 || @ Indians || 4–8 || || || || Cleveland Stadium || 74–57
|- style="background:#cfc;"
| 132 || August 29 || @ Indians || 14–8 || || || – || Cleveland Stadium || 75–57
|- style="background:#fbb;"
| 133 || August 31 || White Sox || 3–11 || || || – || Yankee Stadium || 75–58
|-

|- style="background:#fbb;"
| 134 || September 1 || White Sox || 3–5 || || || || Yankee Stadium || 75–59
|- style="background:#cfc;"
| 135 || September 2 || White Sox || 7–1 || || || – || Yankee Stadium || 76–59
|- style="background:#fbb;"
| 136 || September 3 || Indians || 3–7 || || || || Yankee Stadium || 76–60
|- style="background:#cfc;"
| 137 || September 4 || Indians || 4–0 || || || – || Yankee Stadium || 77–60
|- style="background:#cfc;"
| 138 || September 5 || Indians || 7–2 || || || – || Yankee Stadium || 78–60
|- style="background:#fbb;"
| 142 || September 10 || @ Royals || 5–6 || || || – || Kaufmann Stadium || 78–64
|- style="background:#cfc;"
| 143 || September 11 || @ Royals || 12–5 || || || – || Kaufmann Stadium || 79–64
|- style="background:#fbb;"
| 144 || September 12 || @ Royals || 2–10 || || || – || Kaufmann Stadium || 79–65
|-

|-

Player stats

Batting

Starters by position
Note: Pos = Position; G = Games played; AB = At bats; H = Hits; Avg. = Batting average; HR = Home runs; RBI = Runs batted in

Other batters
Note: G = Games played; AB = At bats; H = Hits; Avg. = Batting average; HR = Home runs; RBI = Runs batted in

Pitching

Starting pitchers
Note: G = Games pitched; IP = Innings pitched; W = Wins; L = Losses; ERA = Earned run average; SO = Strikeouts

Other pitchers
Note: G = Games pitched; IP = Innings pitched; W = Wins; L = Losses; ERA = Earned run average; SO = Strikeouts

Relief pitchers
Note: G = Games pitched; W = Wins; L = Losses; SV = Saves; ERA = Earned run average; SO = Strikeouts

Awards and honors
 Don Mattingly, First Base, Lou Gehrig Memorial Award
 Reggie Jackson's number retired.

Farm system

References

External links
1993 New York Yankees at Baseball Reference
1993 New York Yankees team page at www.baseball-almanac.com

New York Yankees seasons
New York Yankees
New York Yankees
1990s in the Bronx